Euaontia clarki is a species of moth in the family Erebidae. It was first described by William Barnes and James Halliday McDunnough in 1916 and it is found in North America.

The MONA or Hodges number for Euaontia clarki is 8568.

References

Further reading

 
 
 

Boletobiinae
Articles created by Qbugbot
Moths described in 1916